The South Tipperary Senior Hurling Championship (known for sponsorship reasons as the Clonmel Oil South Tipperary Senior Hurling Championship) is an annual hurling competition organised by the South Tipperary Board of the Gaelic Athletic Association since 1907 for senior hurling teams in South Tipperary, Ireland.

The series of games begin in April, with the championship culminating with the final in August. The championship has always been played using a knock-out format.

The South Tipperary Championship was, until recent times, an integral part of the wider Tipperary Senior Hurling Championship. The winners and runners-up of the South Tipperary Championship joined their counterparts from the other three divisions to contest the county championship quarter-finals.

Five clubs currently participate in the Mid Tipperary Championship. The title has been won at least once by 20 different teams. The all-time record-holders are Carrick Swans who have won a total of 23 titles.

Mullinahone are the title-holders after defeating Carrick Swans by 1-18 to 1-16 in the 2019 championship final.

The championship

Overview

The South Tipperary Championship is a knockout tournament with pairings drawn at random — there are no seeds.

Each match is played as a single leg. If a match ends as a draw there is a period of extra time, followed by a second period of extra time should the teams remain deadlocked. If both sides are still level at the end of extra time a replay takes place and so on until a winner is found.

Format
 
Quarter-finals: 2 teams contest this round. The winning teams advances to the semi-finals. The losing team is eliminated from the championship.

Semi-finals: 4 teams contest this round. The 2 winning teams advance to the semi-finals. The 2 losing teams are eliminated from the championship.

Final: The final is contested by the two semi-final winners.

Participating teams

Roll of honour

Finals

References

South Tipperary Senior Hurling Championship